Rylsee (born Cyril Vouilloz; May 17, 1985) is a Swiss artist specialising in hand-drawn font and typography living in Berlin, Germany.

Self-described as being 'Left-handed and Too Shy To Rap', Rylsee is known for his witty wordplay and relatable designs. Some of his ongoing themes include; observations of his daily life, commenting on the digital world – especially regarding smartphone culture and his personal sense of humour. His numbered sketchbooks have received attention from fans and media (especially Instagram) since he began collating them in 2010.

Rylsee is a proclaimed hybrid-artist who expresses himself through a diverse range of mediums. He is also one of the original members and resident artists of the Berlin arts & music venue, Urban Spree.

Background 
Cyril Vouilloz was born on May 17, 1985, in Veyrier (a village just outside of Geneva), Rylsee began drawing when he was a child as a cure for boredom. As a teenager, he was introduced to the skate and graffiti scene, which is where he began to develop his personal artistic style and obsession with letters. During this time, he regularly changed his street art name as a way to experiment with different letters and combinations before settling with his current artist pseudonym 'Rylsee'.

The name 'Rylsee' comes from the French verlan – a type of French slang that involves inverting syllables to turn the word back-to-front. (Cy-ril > Ril-Cee = Rylsee).

After finishing high school in Geneva he completed his CFC in Management and Sales at Ecole de Commerce Emilie-Gourd, Geneva (2001–2004). He then completed his CFC in graphic design at CFP Arts, Geneva (2005–2009). Whilst completing his tertiary studies, Rylsee worked at TranZport Snow & Skate Shop in Geneva.

Artistic style 

Rylsee works in a range of different art forms including; Typography, hand-drawn lettering, illustration, murals, graffiti, sculpture and graphic design.

Rylsee's artistic style is diverse but can be often identified by his unique visual manipulations, optical illusions and the inclusion of words and letters. He quotes "I like to encourage confusion, challenge people and make them question whether what they're looking at is real" – Rylsee, 2019.

Rylsee's work is 'idea-based' and usually subject to visual interpretation. He likes to create images that push people to question what they're looking at. A common theme he communicates is digital or mechanical problems translated in an analog way. An example of one of his optical illusions is his famous 'analog glitch' – a hand drawn glitch or variant form of manipulation that usually includes letters and words.

On a more simple note, Rylsee's designs aim to make people laugh. He quotes "If I can make myself laugh, then I'll do it. I like the idea of making others laugh – some people simply don't laugh enough" – Rylsee, 2019.

Career 

Once completing his education in Geneva, Rylsee moved to Vancouver, where he was a resident artist at the Red Gate Arts Society – Cultural Wildlife Refuge (2010–2011). Here he worked as an artist, designer and curator and exhibited in multiple group shows as well as exhibiting a solo show titled 'Save Sneeril'.

In 2011, Rylsee (along with fellow Red Gate Arts Society members; Jamie Bizness, Kevin House, Jim Carrico and Paulo Costa) was invited to exhibit in a collective show titled 'Las Diferencias Que Coexistem' at Central Galeria De Arte Contemporanea in São Paulo.

His next move was in 2012 to his current city of residence, Berlin, (Germany). Rylsee was quickly adopted as a resident artist at arts & music venue Urban Spree, sharing a studio with fellow artist Andrea Wan. "A resident artist at Urban Spree since the very beginning of the adventure, and through his countless contributions, Rylsee has become more than a friend: he is family" – Pascal Feucher, 2017 (Founder, Urban Spree).

In 2014 Rylsee completed an artist residency at the Zimmer Gallery in Tel Aviv. Here he debuted his famous 'Guess What' alphabet which has become a recurring project. Shortly after this, he was asked to bring the exhibition to Annecy, France to exhibit at the Art By Friends Gallery.

In 2017, Rylsee collaborated with Italian company Moleskine to publish a book titled 'How to Play with Letters' – a monograph on his career and unique artist style. Also during this year, Rylsee exhibited his largest solo show to date titled 'OTHER INBOX' at Urban Spree.

In September 2019, Rylsee showed a new exhibition titled 'GREY ZONE' at Bahama Yellow in Geneva. Based on his 2014 exhibition idea 'Guess What', the GREY ZONE exhibition housed 2 new alphabets - one series of ink drawings and another series of mix-media pieces. Other activities such as workshops and talks were also held during the time of the exhibition.

Throughout his career, Rylsee has participated and exhibited in galleries all over the world. These cities include; Vancouver, Berlin, Tel Aviv, Geneva, Paris, Washington DC, Annecy, Brussels, Valencia, Hamburg, Stuttgart, Santiago, Beirut, São Paulo, Vevey, Denver, La Rochelle, and Barcelona.

Some of his past clients include; Moleskine, Nike, Converse, HP, Opinel, La Clinique de Valère, Tiger Beer x Air Ink, Red Bull, Native Instruments, Nidecker, Caran d'Ache, Motel Campo and Swiss rapper Di-Meh.

Coming from graffiti origins, Rylsee is known for working very fast when creating public art. A selection of his more notable murals include;  'I Wish You Were As Cute As Your Profile Picture' – Dead Chicken Alley, Berlin (2015), 'Where The Sidewalk Ends' – Tel Aviv (2014), Converse #Clashwall – Berlin (2014) and 'AAAAAA' – Annecy (2014). He has also been invited to various mural festivals including; Springtime Delights (2014), Vision Arts Festival (2017) and POW!WOW! DC (2018).

Rylsee also has a collection of side projects that he has founded/co-founded including; SNEEER (a streetwear label co-founded by Rylsee and his brother), Too Shy to Rap (a personal tagline that has unintentionally become a worldwide sticker phenomenon), Make Your Own Sign (a lettering and sign-painting workshop taught by Rylsee and Otto Baum from Klub7), Matanga Empanadas (a Latin-American influenced snack-bar in Berlin), Épicerie Dépoto (a collaborative, interactive gallery/installation with fellow artist Ben Thé), FY! (a creative collective based in Geneva) and The Happy Pinguin (a character-based street art project based in Geneva).

Projects

TOO SHY TO RAP 
The Too Shy To Rap design is arguably Rylsee's most popular and widespread design. Originally drawn for his 2013 solo exhibition in Geneva titled 'Bathroom Poetry', Rylsee kept this particular piece because he 'thought it was funny'. He proceeded to print the design as a sticker in replacement of a business card and without knowing or intention, the Too Shy To Rap sticker phenomenon began.

Regarding the design, he quotes "It turns out a lot of people can relate to it. The strength of the slogan became more and more apparent from people's reaction to the stickers" – Rylsee, 2017. Stickering and graffiti culture is often seen as brash and macho so Rylsee describes his sticker invasion as a 'primal male instinct' and a way of 'marking his territory'.

The Too Shy To Rap stickers have been spotted all over the world including: Switzerland, (Germany), Italy, Belgium, Hong Kong, Chile, Israel, US, France, South Africa, Poland, England, Korea, Netherlands, Czech Republic, Spain, Canada, Brazil and Australia.

In 2015, Rylsee collaborated with Berlin streetwear label SNEEER to produce Too Shy To Rap merchandise and apparel. This is an ongoing collaboration.

SNEEER 
Sneeer is a streetwear project founded by Rylsee and his brother Yann Vouilloz in Berlin in 2016. SNEEER produces a range of unisex apparel, accessories and small goods, as well as Rylsee's 'Too Shy To Rap' merchandise. SNEEER originally began as a t-shirt business as many friends and fans had requested Rylsee's designs on apparel. Since 2016, SNEEER has grown into a fully operational streetwear label and its headquarters are located at Urban Spree in Berlin. SNEEER also collaborates with other artists and musicians to create branded apparel and merchandise. Some of these collaborations include; Catnapp (Monkeytown Records) and Furious Few.

The name 'SNEEER' is a nickname given to Rylsee during his time in Vancouver by friends who could not pronounce his first name (Cyril). It was also a reference to a character called 'Cyril Sneer' from the popular Canadian animated series The Racoons.

Untraditional by nature, SNEEER prefers to release their collections by holding art-exhibition/pop-up store hybrids. These pop-up stores are interactive exhibitions that display a range of Rylsee's artwork as well as present the current SNEEER collection. They aim to engage, entertain and leave a lasting impression on the audience. Presently SNEEER has held pop-up stores/exhibitions in Geneva and Berlin.

Make Your Own Sign (MYOS) 
A sign painting workshop conducted by Rylsee and Klub7 artist Otto Baum since 2013.

Attendees are taught basic techniques of lettering in workshops with professionals. The goal of the workshops are to provide the skills for making effective hand-lettering compositions and hand-painted wood sign for personal or business development. The topics covered include:

 Basic knowledge and rules of typography and lettering
 Visual communication through the use of letters
 Lettering techniques and tools
 Secret tricks from Otto Baum & Rylsee

MYOS workshops have been conducted in Berlin (Urban Spree), Tel Aviv (Zimmer Gallery), Annecy (Art by Friends), Geneva (The Square) and Stuttgart (Tischedecke).

Matanga Empanadas 
Matanga Empanadas is a Latin-American influenced snack-bar founded by Rylsee and his brother Yann Vouilloz in 2019. The tagline is 'Inspired from there – handmade here'. The snack-bar is currently based in the beer garden of Berlin's art & music venue, Urban Spree

Épicerie Dépoto 
Épicerie Dépoto is Rylsee's biggest art piece to date. In collaboration with fellow Swiss artist Ben Thé, the duo created a fake 'épicerie' or corner store in which everything was created and made by them. This included false advertisements, packaging, products, television commercials and costumes. The installation was held at the Highlight Gallery in Geneva from November 2015 to February 2016.

FY! 
Forever Young! (FY!) was a collective consisting of Swiss creatives; Rylsee, Gabriel Balagué, Alan Schmalz and Guillaume Denervaud. The crew worked on mural & design projects in Geneva from 2007 to 2009.

The Happy Pinguin 
The Happy Pinguin was a comical public art project that featured an illustrated penguin character founded by Rylsee when he was 16. It was born out of the idea of Rylsee not wanting to become a 'penguin' when he grew up – aka not wearing a suit. The original designs were drawn, photocopied onto sticker paper and individually cut out at the skate shop that Rylsee then worked at. They were spread around the city, with The Happy Pinguin often 'playing out' the roles of its surroundings (e.g. skating in the skatepark or climbing up a lamppost).

The Happy Pinguin was very popular in Geneva and was described as funny, relatable and loveable. It was even featured as one of the 'Symbols of the City' in the local newspaper – Tribune de Genève.

Solo exhibitions 

 Grey Zone – Bahama Yellow, Geneva (2019)
Other Inbox – Urban Spree, Berlin (2017)
 Guess What – Art By Friends Gallery (2014)
 Guess What – Zimmer Gallery Tel Aviv (2014)
 Bathroom Poetry – The Square, Geneva (2013)
 Too Old To Die Young – Dockers pop up store, Berlin (2013)
 Ossem Lächli Geets Es Bächli – IDRAWALOT Gallery, Berlin (2012)
 Save Sneeril – RedGate Gallery, Vancouver (2010)
 Work By Rylsee – Hard to Find, Geneva (2009)

Group shows and festivals 

 POW! WOW! DC – Allocated Location, Washington DC (2018)
 Opinel Series x Art By Friends – Opinel Museum, France (2018)
 Greetings From Nowhere – SNEEER Pop Up Store, Berlin (2018)
 Punchlines Worldwide Group Show – Art By Friends Gallery (2018)
 Another View – Plastic Murs Gallery, Valencia (2017)
 Urban Spree at La Vallée – La Vallée, Brussels (2016)
 Art Prague – Clam Gallas Palace Prague, Prague (2016)
 Forgotten Memories – Galeria Lira, Santiago (2016)
 L'Èpicerie Dépoto – Highlight Gallery, Geneva (2015–2016)
 Common Fest – La Magnanerie Beirut, Beirut (2015)
 Made in Berlin – Galerie Magoth, Paris (2015)
 Knotenpunkt 15 – Affenfaust Galerie, Hamburg (2015)
 Ride The Wall – La SIP, Geneva (2015)
 Ride The Wall – GAS, Geneva (2014)
 What if..? – Neurotitan Gallery, Berlin & Denver (2014)
 Bromance – Tischedecke, Stuttgart (2014)
 Springtime Delights – Tour de la Lanterne, La Rochelle (2014)
 Art By Friends No. 6 – White & Art Gallery, Brussels (2014)
 Millerntor Gallery – Millerntor Stadium, Hamburg (2014)
 In Yo' Face – Pictoplasma Festival, Berlin (2013)
 Group Show – EBÓ MultiArtes, São Paulo (2013)
 The Circle Show – Urban Spree Gallery, Berlin (2013)
 Burning Ink – The Square, Geneva (2013)
 Group show for upcoming artists – Musée Rath, Geneva (2013)
 Pictobello – Festival International d'illustration, Vevey (2012)
 Tattoo The Girl – MUTUO Centro de Arte, Barcelona (2012)
 Côtlette – The Square, Geneva (2012)
 Las Diferencias Que Coexistem – Central Galeria De Arte Contemporânea, São Paulo (2012)
 Drawuary No. 2 – RedGate Gallery, Vancouver (2011)
 Emergent Genevan Artists – La Mansarde Gallery, Geneva (2011)
 100 Amigos – El Kartel, Vancouver (2010)
 Rocktober – Davie St Pop-Up Gallery, Vancouver (2010)
 The Monster Mash – RedGate Gallery, Vancouver (2010)
 Dirty Soap Box – RedGate Gallery, Vancouver (2010)
 Art Deck – TranZport Pop-Up gallery, Geneva (2009)

Bibliography 

 Rylsee (2017). How to Play with Letters. Moleskine SpA. 

How To Play With Letters is the first published monograph by Rylsee. It is described by its publisher as a surprising, exciting and playful explanation of contemporary letter art and an ideal guide for anyone with an interest in cutting edge art and design.

Further reading

Books featuring interviews/works from Rylsee 

 Art By Friends (2018). Opinel Séries: Art By Friends. Art By Friends. (p. 42-45).
 Robinson, Brooke (2018). Goodtype: The Art of lettering, Volume 2. Rizzoli. (p. 234-235) 
 Viction Workshop (2017). Handstyle Lettering: From Calligraphy To Typography. Victionary. (p. 016–021) 
 Robinson, Brooke (2015). Goodtype: The Book, Volume 1. Bucherie LLC (p. 45).
 MAOW (2015). MAOW Books #2: Second Paper Edition. MAOW. (p. 37).
 Viva con Agua by Sankt Pauli eV (2014). Art Creates Water: Millerntor Gallery #4, GUDBERG Verlag. (p. 194).

Magazines featuring interviews/works from Rylsee 

 Polpettas Magazine (p. 8-25) – Spain (2018)
 +81 magazine (p. 70-73) – Japan (2018)
 Fold Magazine – Italy (2017)
 IG1: Creativity Reflected (p. 85) – USA (2016)
 Urban Spree Books (p. 26) – Germany (2016)
 Étape Magazine – France (2015)
 PAGE: Design. Code. Business (p. 28) – Germany (2015)
 Go Out! November (p. 12) – Switzerland (2015)
 Klebstoff Magazine No. 6 – Germany (2014)
 Lodown magazine – Germany (2014)
 Go Out! (p. 18) – Switzerland (2014)
 Move On Mag – France (2014)
 Redux Magazine No. 43 – France (2013)
 Tribune de Genève – Switzerland (2012)
 Transworld Magazine – USA (2009)
 Source Snowboard Magazine – Germany (2009)

Appearances

Guest Speaking and Conferences 

 Royaume du Web – Geneva (2018)
 Pontificia Universidad Católica de Chile – Chile (2017)

Video and radio 

 Louis Media X Orange.fr – France (2019)
 Tataki/RTS – Switzerland (2018)
 Vantage Point Radio – Germany (2016)
 Skillshare – USA (2015)
 Arte – Germany (2014)
 Converse – Germany (2014)
 Mix TV – Brasil (2011)

References

External links 
 Personal Website
 Sneeer Website

Swiss artists
1985 births
Living people